In geometry, a hendecagrammic prism is a star polyhedron made from two identical regular hendecagrams connected by squares. The related hendecagrammic antiprisms are made from two identical regular hendecagrams connected by equilateral triangles.

Hendecagrammic prisms and  bipyramids
There are 4 hendecagrammic uniform prisms, and 6 hendecagrammic uniform antiprisms. The prisms are constructed by 4.4.11/q vertex figures,  Coxeter diagram. The hendecagrammic bipyramids, duals to the hendecagrammic prisms are also given.

Hendecagrammic antiprisms

The antiprisms with 3.3.3.3.11/q vertex figures, . Uniform antiprisms exist for p/q>3/2, and are called crossed for p/q<2. For hendecagonal antiprism, two crossed antiprisms can not be constructed as uniform (with equilateral triangles): 11/8, and 11/9.

Hendecagrammic trapezohedra
The hendecagrammic trapezohedra are duals to the hendecagrammic antiprisms.

See also
Prismatic uniform polyhedron

References

External links

Polyhedra